La Delta (Spanish for "The River delta) is an unincorporated community in the Mojave Desert, within San Bernardino County, California, United States.

La Delta is located, near the Mojave River in the northern Victor Valley.

References

Unincorporated communities in San Bernardino County, California
Populated places in the Mojave Desert
Mojave River
Victor Valley
Unincorporated communities in California